Kaï is a village and rural commune in the Cercle of Kadiolo in the Sikasso Region of southern Mali. The commune covers an area of 183 square kilometers and includes 8 villages. In the 2009 census it had a population of 8,827. The village of Kaï, the administrative center (chef-lieu) of the commune, is 47 km north of Kadiolo.

References

External links
.

Communes of Sikasso Region